Charles Sweeton House, also known as Mount Pleasant School, is a historic home located in Center Township, Vanderburgh County, Indiana. The original two-room brick Mount Pleasant schoolhouse was built in 1888, and remodeled and expanded in 1926 into a two-story, Bungalow style private residence.  The exterior is sheathed in stucco and the front facade features a full-width one-story porch with Doric order columns and a central eyebrow arch.

It was added to the National Register of Historic Places in 2005.

References

Houses on the National Register of Historic Places in Indiana
Bungalow architecture in Indiana
Houses completed in 1926
Houses in Vanderburgh County, Indiana
National Register of Historic Places in Vanderburgh County, Indiana